Limbergo Taccola (January 1, 1928 -2003) was an Italian professional football player.

He played 1 game in the Serie A in the 1949/50 season for A.S. Roma. Taccola suffered a serious injury during an automobile accident while playing with Pisa S.C. and had to retire from playing football.

Taccola died in November 2003.

References

1928 births
2003 deaths
Italian footballers
Serie A players
A.S. Roma players
S.S. Chieti Calcio players
Pisa S.C. players
F.C. Esperia Viareggio players
Association football midfielders
People from Viareggio
Sportspeople from the Province of Lucca
Footballers from Tuscany